F-22 Total Air War, also known as Total Air War or by its acronym TAW, is a combat flight simulation video game developed by Digital Image Design and published by Infogrames United Kingdom in 1998. It simulates the F-22 Raptor fighter aircraft. It's a sequel to F-22: Air Dominance Fighter.

Gameplay
The notable features in the game include the ability for the player to dynamically alter their flight campaigns and the realistic physics engine. The storyline in the game revolves around a war campaign over the Red Sea between two ambiguous fighting forces which both feature modern air-combat sorties that are launched against each other in an all out total aerial war. Because the campaign missions are dynamically selected by a computer algorithm built into the game based on the player's performance in battle and random events in the game, no two air missions the player plays should ever be the same.

Reception
The Academy of Interactive Arts & Sciences nominated Total Air War for its 1998 "Simulation Game of the Year" award, although the game lost to Need for Speed III: Hot Pursuit. Total Air War was a finalist for Computer Gaming Worlds 1998 "Best Simulation" award, which ultimately went to European Air War.

References

External links

Gamespot.com summary and review of TAW

1998 video games
Combat flight simulators
Video game sequels
Video games developed in the United Kingdom
Windows games
Windows-only games
Digital Image Design games
Multiplayer and single-player video games